Counting all degrees, Harvard University comes in first place in terms of the total number of billionaire alumni. Harvard also comes in first if only bachelor's degrees are counted, according to a 2021 Forbes report. Harvard also ranks first in the number of ultra-high net worth alumni with assets greater than $30 million. Harvard's total number of ultra-high net worth alumni is more than twice that of the next highest ranking institution, Stanford. These figures have not been adjusted for the relative size of these institutions.

The list is dominated by US universities, which account for all of the global top 10 universities by number of billionaire alumni.

Global top 10 universities by number of billionaire alumni per Wealth-X 2018

Global top 20 universities by number of ultra high net worth alumni (>$30 million) per Wealth-X 2019

Global top 20 universities by number of ultra high net worth alumni (>$30 million) per Altrata 2022

Global top 20 universities by number of billionaire undergraduate alumni per Wealth-X 2014

Global top 11 universities by number of undergraduate billionaire alumni per Forbes 2021

Top 12 US universities by number of undergraduate alumni† on 2021 Forbes 400 list

Top 11 US universities by number of undergraduate alumni† on 2022 Forbes 400 list 

† Includes only those alumni who received undergraduate degrees

Top 8 US universities by share of centimillionaires (>$100 million) per Henley & Partners 

† Includes only U.S. residents worth more than $100 million

See also
List of countries by number of billionaires
List of cities by number of billionaires
List of wealthiest historical figures

References

External links

Billionaire